The 2008 NORCECA Beach Volleyball Circuit at Carolina was held May 21–26, 2008 in Carolina, Puerto Rico. It was the sixth leg of the NORCECA Beach Volleyball Circuit 2008.

Women's competition

Men's competition

External links

 Norceca

Puerto Rico
Norceca Beach Volleyball Circuit (Puerto Rico), 2008
International volleyball competitions hosted by Puerto Rico